Acacia arrecta, commonly known as Yarnda Nyirra wattle or Fortescue wattle, is a shrub of the genus Acacia and the subgenus Plurinerves that is endemic to arid areas in north western Australia.

Description
It usually has multiple stems and can have few branches a ground level and has smooth, grey bark that can be fissured at the very base of the main stems. The branchlets have resinous ribbing. Like most species of Acacia it has phyllodes rather than true leaves. The grey-green, resinous and terete phyllodes narrow to a hard non-spiny point. It blooms from January to December and produces yellow flowers.

Taxonomy
The species was first formally described by the botanist Bruce Maslin in 1982 as part of the work Studies in the genus Acacia (Leguminosae: Mimosoideae) - 11. Acacia species of the Hamersley Range area, Western Australia as published in the journal Nuytsia. It was reclassified in  2003 by Leslie Pedley as Racosperma arrectum then transferred back to genus Acacia in 2006.

Distribution
It is native to an area in the Pilbara region of Western Australia where it is commonly situated on stony flats and low rocky hills growing in shallow rocky soils. The range of the plant is from around Millstream Chichester National Park in the west to around Nullagine in the east and as far south as the Hamersley Range near Wittenoom. It is quite common in areas where it is found but has an overall scattered distribution. It is usually a part of shrubland communities that is dominated spinifex.

See also
 List of Acacia species

References

arrecta
Acacias of Western Australia
Plants described in 1982
Taxa named by Bruce Maslin